The ADVICS Cup is an annual bonspiel, or curling tournament, held at the Tokoro Curling Hall in Kitami, Japan. It has been held twice, first in 2019 as part of the men's and women's World Curling Tour. In 2022, it was held as part of the Hokkaido Curling Tour. The tournament is held in a round robin format.

Past Champions

Men

Women

References

World Curling Tour events
Curling competitions in Japan
Kitami, Hokkaido
Women's World Curling Tour events
Sport in Hokkaido